Agios Panteleimonas (Greek: Άγιος Παντελεήμωνας) is a small coastal settlement in the community of Lechaina, Greece. It is 4 km northwest of Lechaina proper. Its population was 37 in the 2011 census. There are two churches, Agios Panteleimonas and Agios Athanasios. It has a small port. The settlement was founded in the 1930s.

Data

External links
GTP - Agios Panteleimonas

See also
List of settlements in Elis

References 

Lechaina
Populated places in Elis